Meet is an Indian Hindi-language television drama series that premiered on August 23, 2021, on Zee TV and digitally streams on ZEE5, produced by Shashi Sumeet Productions. It replaced Hamari Wali Good News. The show stars Ashi Singh and Shagun Pandey in the lead-roles. It is a remake of Zee Sarthak's Sindura Bindu.

Plot

The show explores the story of Meet Hooda, a spirited young girl from Haryana .Her father was a police officer who sacrificed his life due to which Meet takes up all the responsibilities of her house.

Meet Hooda meets Meet Ahlawat. Though they initially are at loggerheads, but soon become friends. Ahlawat falls in love with Hooda's sister Manushi and their wedding is arranged. Ahlawat breaks his friendship with Meet . On the wedding day, Manushi runs away and marries Kunal leading Meet Hooda to marry Meet Ahlawat. No one's happy about this and Meet Ahlawat is unwilling to accept her as his wife. Eventually the Ahlawat family start accepting Meet Hooda and Meet Ahlawat wishes to start a new life with her.

Meet decides to join the police force and goes for  police training and is designated as a sub-inspector.

Soon Meet's pregnancy is announced. After a few months, Meet goes into labor and she delivers a baby. Manushi kidnaps the newborn . A shattered Babita is manipulated by Masoom and she informs Meet about the baby and also begs her to leave her son forever. Meet somehow discovers her baby is alive and has been kidnapped by Manushi. She rushes for her baby but Manushi burns down the place and Meet gets caught in it. Meet is presumed to be dead by everyone.

1 year later

Meet is actually alive. She is in the form of Manjari Desai who hails from Vadodara to find her baby. She is all set to take seek revenge from Manushi, Kunal and Masoom for taking away her family, husband and child. Soon the duo, Meet and Meet, unite and are again expecting a baby. Unfortunately after a series of events, Meet Hooda and Meet Ahlawat lose their baby in a tragic accident where Meet Hooda's mother ending up in coma.

Cast

Main
 Ashi Singh as Meet Sangwan (nee: Hooda, formerly: Ahlawat)(formerly:Manjari Desai): Anubha and Ashok's younger daughter; Manushi's sister; Meet Ahlawat's widow; Manmeet's wife (2021–present)
 Shagun Pandey as 
 Meet Ahlawat: Rajvardhan and Babita's younger son; Masoom and Tej's brother; Shantanu, Esha, Ishani and Kunal's cousin; Meet Hooda's first Husband (2021–2023)
 Manmeet Sangwan: Meet Ahlawat's lookalike; Yashodha's son; Meet's second husband (2023–present)

Recurring
 Abha Parmar as Mrs. Hooda: Ashok's mother; Manushi and Meet Hooda's grandmother (2021–present)
 Vaishnavi Macdonald as Anubha Hooda: Ashok's widow; Manushi and Meet Hooda's mother (2021–2022)
 Sharain Khanduja as Manushi Hooda: Anubha and Ashok's elder daughter; Meet Hooda's sister; Kunal's wife (2021–2022)
 Ravi Gossain as Inspector Ashok Hooda: Mrs. Hooda's son; Anubha's husband; Manushi and Meet Hooda's father (2021) (Dead)
 Pratham Kunwar as Kunal: Rajvardhan and Ram's nephew; Masoom, Tej, Meet Ahlawat, Esha and Ishani's cousin; Manushi's husband (2021–2022)
 Sooraj Thapar as Rajvardhan Ahlawat: Ram's brother; Babita's husband; Masoom, Tej and Meet Ahlawat's father; Duggu's grandfather; Jr. Ram and Lakhan's adoptive grandfather (2021–present)
 Sonica Handa as Babita Rana Ahlawat: Abhay's sister; Rajvardhan's wife; Shantanu's aunt; Masoom, Tej and Meet Ahlawat's mother; Duggu's grandmother; Jr. Ram and Lakhan's adoptive grandmother (2021–present)
 Nisha Rawal / Parakh Madan as Masoom Ahlawat: Rajvardhan and Babita's daughter; Tej and Meet Ahlawat's sister; Shantanu, Esha, Ishani and Kunal's cousin; Hoshiyar's wife; Duggu's mother (2021–2022) / (2022–2023)
 Adityarao Nuniwal as Hoshiyar: Chhavi's brother; Masoom's husband; Duggu's father (2021–2022)
 Het Makwana as Duggu: Masoom and Hoshiyar's son (2021–2022)
 Vishal Gandhi as Tej Ahlawat: Rajvardhan and Babita's elder son; Masoom and Meet Ahlawat's brother; Shantanu, Esha, Ishani and Kunal's cousin; Sunaina's husband; Jr. Ram and Lakhan's adoptive father (2021–2022)
 Riyanka Chanda as Sunaina Singh Ahlawat: Jaypratap's daughter; Tej's wife; Jr. Ram and Lakhan's adoptive mother (2021–2023)
 Afzaal Khan as Ram Ahlawat: Rajvardhan's brother; Ragini's husband; Ishani and Esha's father (2021–present)
 Preeti Puri as Ragini Ahlawat: Ram's wife; Esha's mother; Ishani's step-mother (2021–present)
 Tamanna Jaiswal as Esha Ahlawat Beniwal: Ram and Ragini's daughter; Ishani's half-sister; Masoom, Tej, Meet Ahlawat and Kunal's cousin; Shantanu's ex-wife; Deep's widow (2021–2022)
 Ashutosh Semwal as Deep Beniwal: Rajvardhan's employee; Barfi Devi's son; Neelam's brother; Meet Ahlawat's colleague and childhood friend; Esha's husband (2021–2022) (Dead)
 Surbhi Talodiya as Ishani Ahlawat: Ram and Sushma's daughter; Ragini's step-daughter; Esha's half-sister; Masoom, Tej and Meet Ahlawat's cousin (2022–present)
 Dhairya Dwivedi as Jr. Ram Ahlawat: Tej and Sunaina's elder adoptive son; Lakhan's adoptive brother (2021–2022)
 Vaidik Poriya as Lakhan Ahlawat: Tej and Sunaina's younger adoptive son; Jr. Ram's adoptive brother (2021–2022)
 Shalini Mahal as Chhavi: Hoshiyaar's sister (2021–2022)
 Manish Khanna as Jaypratap Singh: Sunaina's father (2021–2022)
 Manoj Kolhatkar as Inspector Hawa Singh (2022)
 Chandan Anand as Minister Abhay Rana: Babita's brother; Shantanu's father; Ashok's killer (2022)
 Ankit Vyas as Shantanu "Shanty" Rana: Abhay's son; Masoom, Tej and Meet Ahlawat's cousin; Esha's ex-husband (2022)
 Gazal Sood as Tanya: Meet Ahlawat's college friend (2022)
 Asmita Sharma as Barfi Beniwal: Deep and Neelam's mother (2022)
 Gouri Agarwal as Neelam Beniwal: Deep's sister; Barfi Devi's daughter
 Randeep Rai as Advocate Anurag Rathi: Meet Hooda's enemy-turned friend (2022) (Cameo)
 Dinesh Mehta as Robber (2022–2023)
 Riya Subodh as Robber (2022–2023)
 Javed Pathan as Robber (2022–2023)
 Prachi Kadam as anubha (2023–present)
 Yogendra Singh as Mahendra Sangwan (2023–present)
 Hridayansh Shekhawat (2023–present)
 Mohit Sachdev as Narendra (2023–present)
 Susheel Singh as sarkar (2023–present)
 Garima Srivastav as Yashoda Sangwan: Sarkar's wife; Manmeet's mother (2023–present)
 Krutika Khira (2023–present)
 Sheetal Dabholkar as gunwanti (2023–present)
 Pranjali Singh Parihar as sapna (2023–present)
 Shivendra Sanyal (2023–present)
 Dolphin Dwivedi as sundari (2023–present)
 Priyanka Bora as imrati  (2023–present)
 Palak Rana as meghna (2023–present)
 Aman Maheshwari as S.P. neeraj bhati (2023–present)
 Mahi Soni as Veera (gunwanti and mahender's daughter (2023–present)

Guests

Production

Development
The marriage track in the show was a high-budget track, probably the most spent track in the series.

Release
In August 2021, Zee TV announced two new shows at their early slots namely Meet and Rishton Ka Manjha and both the shows were launched on the same date.

Awards and nominations

References 

2021 Indian television series debuts
Hindi-language television shows
Indian drama television series
Indian television soap operas
Television shows set in Mumbai
Zee TV original programming